Emma Hunter (born ) is a Canadian actress and comedian. She is known for her recurring role as Nisha in the sitcom Mr. D, and as co-anchor with Miguel Rivas of the news satire series The Beaverton. She has also appeared in several other productions, including the television series L.A. Complex and Royal Canadian Air Farce, and the independent feature film Mary Goes Round (2018). In 2017, she was featured in the CBC web series How to Buy a Baby, and in 2020 she hosted the reality cooking competition series Fridge Wars.

In 2018, Hunter received three Canadian Screen Award nominations at the 6th Canadian Screen Awards, in the categories of Best Supporting Actress in a Comedy Program or Series for Mr. D, Best Ensemble Performance in a Variety or Sketch Comedy Program or Series for The Beaverton, and Best Actress in a Web Program or Series for Save Me. She won the award for Best Actress in a Web Program or Series. She was also co-host of the televised Canadian Screen Awards gala, alongside Jonny Harris. In 2020, she narrated a portion of the 8th Canadian Screen Awards.

In 2021, she appeared as a guest judge in a second season episode of Canada's Drag Race.

Awards and nominations

References

External links

Canadian television actresses
Canadian voice actresses
Canadian stand-up comedians
Canadian sketch comedians
Canadian women comedians
Canadian Screen Award winners
Living people
Canadian web series actresses
21st-century Canadian actresses
1980s births
Canadian television hosts
21st-century Canadian comedians
Canadian women television hosts
Canadian Comedy Award winners